Paraplatyptilia metzneri is a moth of the family Pterophoridae that is found in France, Switzerland, Italy, Croatia, Bosnia and Herzegovina, North Macedonia, Serbia and Montenegro, Albania, Bulgaria, Russia, Turkey, China, Iran and Mongolia.

The larvae possibly feed on Astragalus species.

References

Moths described in 1841
maea
Moths of Asia
Moths of Europe
Taxa named by Philipp Christoph Zeller